Happening '68 was a rock-and-roll variety show produced by Dick Clark Productions, which aired on the American Broadcasting Company (ABC) network. The show followed American Bandstand on Saturday afternoons. Happening '68 premiered on January 6, 1968 and was popular enough that ABC added a weekday spin-off. It's Happening ran on Mondays through Fridays from July 15, 1968 through October 25, 1968.  When 1968 ended, Happening '68 became just Happening, which was canceled in October 1969.
 
Happening '68 was co-hosted by Mark Lindsay and Paul Revere. Their band Paul Revere and the Raiders made frequent appearances. There were guest performers lip-synching their latest releases, band contests with celebrity judges and other bits to attract teenage audiences.

The prize for each winning band was a contract with ABC Records.

Regulars
Paul Revere (Host)
Mark Lindsay (Host)

Guests on "Happening '68" & "Happening '69"

 Don Adams
 Keith Allison (solo)
 The American Breed
 Lucie Arnaz & Desi Arnaz Jr.
 Chuck Barris
 Joey Bishop
 Beach Boys
 Beach Boys (film)
 Box Tops
 Tommy Boyce & Bobby Hart
 Phyllis Brides (Tiger Beat Magazine)
 Eric Burdon & The Animals (film)
 Carol Burnett
 Glen Campbell
 Nino Candido
 Canned Heat
 Dick Cavett
 Dick Clark
 Classics IV (film)
 Marc Copage
 The Cowsills
 Bob Crane
 Creedence Clearwater Revival
 Jackie DeShannon
 Everly Brothers
 Barbara Feldon
 Eddie Fisher
 Four King Cousins, The
 Aretha Franklin (film)
 John Fred & His Playboy Band
 Friends of Distinction
 Marvin Gaye
 Grass Roots
 Paul Hampton
 Harpers Bizarre
 Jonathan Harris
 Bobby Hatfield
 Edwin Hawkins Singers
 Goldie Hawn
 Lee Hazlewood (film)
 Jimi Hendrix (film)
 Audrey Holst (Fave Magazine)
 Etta James
 Tommy James & The Shondells
 Jim & Jean (film)
 Arte Johnson
 Sajid Khan
 Andy Kim
 Gladys Knight & The Pips
 Peter Lawford
 Gary Lewis & The Playboys
 Mark Lindsay (solo)
 Little Dion
 Guy Marks
 Dick Martin
 Bill Medley
 Ross Martin
 The Monkees (without Peter Tork)
 Greg Morris
 Ann Moses (Tiger Beat Magazine)
 Nazz
 Rick Nelson
 Leonard Nimoy
 Nitty Gritty Dirt Band
 Esther & Abi Ofarim
 Oliver
 Pat Paulsen
 People!
 Peppermint Rainbow
 Peppermint Trolley Company
 Wilson Pickett
 Paul Revere & The Raiders
 Don Rickles
 Tommy Roe
 Kenny Rogers & The First Edition
 Linda Ronstadt
 Merrilee Rush
 Bobby Rydell
 Peggy Scott & Jo Jo Benson
 The Bob Seger System
 Bobby Sherman
 Frank Sinatra Jr.
 O.C. Smith
 Tommy Smothers
 Joe South
 Spiral Starecase
 Don Steele
 Steppenwolf
 Ray Stevens
 Stone Poneys
 Sly & The Family Stone
 Strawberry Alarm Clock
 Sunshine Company
 Three Dog Night
 Frankie Valli & The Four Seasons
 Bobby Vee
 The Ventures
 Lawrence Welk
 Freddy Weller (solo)
 Mason Williams (film)
 The Who (film)
 Stevie Wonder
 Brenton Wood
 JoAnne Worley
 Efrem Zimbalist Jr.

Appearing as Band Contest judges

 1968 U.S. Olympic Swim Team (Mike Burton, Debbie Meyer, Ken Merten)
 Keith Allison
 Stefan Arngrim
 Michael Burns
 Freddy Cannon
 Angela Cartwright
 Enzo Cerusico
 Michael Christian
 Dennis Cole
 Yvonne Craig
 Jackie DeShannon
 Dino, Desi & Billy
 Samantha Dolenz
 James Doohan
 Peter Duel
 Warren Entner
 Fabian
 Sally Field
 Kathy Garver
 Christopher George
 Don Grady
 Bridget Hanley
 Bobby Hatfield
 Michael James
 Casey Kasem
 Sajid Khan
 Walter Koenig
 Vicki Lawrence
 Gary Lewis
 Sal Mineo
 Chris Montez
 Ann Moses (from Tiger Beat magazine)
 Jay North
 Gary Owens
 Regis Philbin
 Jon Provost
 The Raiders
 Tommy Roe
 Merrilee Rush
 Lalo Schifrin
 Bobby Sherman
 Kevin Shultz
 Mark Slade
 David Soul
 Johnny Tillotson
 Peter Tork
 Brenton Wood
 Bobby Vee
 Jan Michael Vincent
 Stephen Young

Guests on "It's Happening"

 Barbara Acklin
 Don Adams
 Steve Allen
 Nancy Ames
 Stefan Arngrim
 The Association
 Chuck Barris Syndicate
 Shelley Berman
 Joey Bishop
 The Blossoms
 Simmy Bow
 Tommy Boyce
 Tony Butala (of The Lettermen)
 Bobby Brooks
 James Brown
 Jerry Butler
 Cherry People
 Dick Clark
 The Collage
 The Colours
 Christopher Connelly
 Professor Irwin Corey
 Jackie DeShannon
 Phyllis Diller
 Dino, Desi & Billy
 Patti Drew
 Clint Eastwood
 Ron Eliran
 Eternity's Children
 José Feliciano
 Sally Field
 Five Americans
 The Four King Cousins
 Four Tops
 Max Frost & The Troopers
 Bobby Goldsboro
 The Grass Roots
 Roosevelt Grier
 Harpers Bizarre
 Jonathan Harris and The Robot
 Richard Harris
 Bobby Hart
 Bobby Hatfield
 Barbara Hershey
 Ann Howard
 Hubert H. Humphrey
 Iron Butterfly
 Mick Jagger
 Tommy James & The Shondells
 Jay & The Techniques
 Peter Kastner
 Kurt Kasznar
 Sajid Khan
 Gladys Knight & The Pips
 Alan Jay Lerner
 Lewis & Clarke Expedition
 Rich Little
 The Marvellos
 Lee Marvin
 The McCoys
 Bill Medley
 Corbett Monica
 Chris Montez
 Greg Morris
 Johnny Nash
 Harry Nilsson
 Kathy Orloff
 Gary Owens
 Paris Sisters
 Jerry Paris
 Regis Philbin
 The Picardy
 Harve Presnell
 Professor Morrison's Lollipop
 Dack Rambo
 Frankie Randall
 Marge Redmond
 Della Reese
 Paul Revere & The Raiders
 Don Rickles
 Jeannie C. Riley
 Linda Ronstadt
 Merrilee Rush
 Sam & Dave
 Lalo Schifrin
 Madeleine Sherwood
 Jean Shrimpton
 Bob Siller
 O.C. Smith
 Spirit
 Robert Stack
 Steppenwolf
 Ray Stevens
 Strawberry Alarm Clock
 Rip Taylor
 Johnny Tillotson
 The Turtles
 Ray Walston
 Jimmy Webb
 Joe Williams
 Mason Williams
 Roger Williams
 Al Wilson
 Stevie Wonder
 Brenton Wood
 Bobby Vee
 The Vogues
 Donna Jean Young

References

External links
 

1960s American variety television series
1968 American television series debuts
1969 American television series endings
American Broadcasting Company original programming
English-language television shows
Rock music television series
Television series by Dick Clark Productions